Låven is a mountain in Skjåk Municipality in Innlandet county, Norway. The mountain is surrounded by several other notable mountains including Hesthøi to the northeast, Hestbrepiggene to the south, Holåtindan to the west, Gjelhøi to the northwest, and Hestdalshøgdi to the north.

See also
List of mountains of Norway

References

Skjåk
Mountains of Innlandet